is a Japanese actress, voice actress, singer and narrator from Tokyo. She is affiliated with Production Baobab.

She is best known for her roles as Chi in Chi's Sweet Home, and as Himawari Nohara in Crayon Shin-chan, Misty's Togepi and Togetic in both the Japanese and English-language versions of the Pokémon anime, Goma-chan in Shonen Ashibe and May from Guilty Gear.

In addition to Togepi, during the Indigo League season of Pokémon, Kōrogi also voiced Ritchie's Pikachu nicknamed "Sparky" in both versions. She also voiced Casey's Chikorita, Bayleef and Meganium during the Johto series.

She is bilingual; the first being Japanese and the second is English.

Filmography

Television animation
Blood Blockade Battlefront (Aligura)
Chi's Sweet Home (Chi)
Clannad After Story (Ushio Okazaki)
Comic Party (Asahi Sakurai)
Crayon Shin-chan (Himawari Nohara, Megumi Yamura)
Dragon Ball Super (Omni-King)
Excel Saga (Menchi, Sandora, Puchū, Ropponmatsu 2, Kumi Kumi, others)
Fairy Tail (Frosch)
Floral Magician Mary Bell (Yūri)
Fresh Pretty Cure (Chiffon)
Fullmetal Alchemist (Nina Tucker)
Fushigiboshi no Futagohime (Poomo)
Gasaraki (Misuzu Gowa)
Go! Princess PreCure (Tina)
Jeanie with the Light Brown Hair (Jimmy)
Jigoku Shōjo (Inko)
Zatch Bell! (Ponygon)
Kore wa Zombie Desu ka? (Delusion Eucliwood)
Kyatto Ninden Teyandee (Otama)
Love Hina (Mecha-Tama-chan)
Magic Knight Rayearth (Sanyun)
Mahōjin Guru Guru (Migu)
Mama wa Shōgaku 4 Nensei (Natsumi Mizuki)
Miracle Giants Dome-kun (Kaori)
Mobile Suit Victory Gundam (Suzy Relane, Karlmann Doukatous, Connie Francis)
Nichijou (Cider at episode 12)
Ojarumaru (Ai Tamura, Kame Kameda, Tome Kameda, Enma Wife, others)
Planetes (Nono)
Please Teacher! (Maho Kazami)
Pokémon (Togepi, Pichu, Mew, others)
Pop Team Epic (Popuko (Episode 7 A-part)
Raimuiro Senkitan (Kuki)
Revolutionary Girl Utena (Chu-Chu, Shadow Girl B)
Rurouni Kenshin (Sakura)
Saint Tail (Ruby)
Scrapped Princess (Natalie)
Shukufuku no Campanella (Tango)
Steam Detectives (Marian)
Shōnen Ashibe (Goma-chan)
Tamagotchi! (Hapihapitchi, Doremitchi)
Turn A Gundam (Lulu)
Yuri's World (Cat)

Theatrical animation
Pocket Monsters the Movie – Mewtwo Strikes Back (1998) (Kasumi's Togepi)
Pocket Monsters the Movie - Mirage Pokémon: Lugia's Explosive Birth (1999) (Kasumi's Togepi)
Pocket Monsters the Movie - Emperor of the Crystal Tower (2000) (Kasumi's Togepi)
Pocket Monsters the Movie - Celebi: Encounter Beyond Time (2001) (Kasumi's Togepi)
Pocket Monsters the Movie - Guardian Gods of the City of Water (2002) (Kasumi's Togepi)
Pocket Monsters Advanced Generation the Movie - Mew and the Wave Hero: Lucario (2005) (Mew)
Pocket Monsters the Movie – Mewtwo Strikes Back: EVOLUTION (2019) (Kasumi's Togepi)
Paprika (2006) (Japanese doll)
Tamagotchi: Happiest Story in the Universe! (2008) (Hapihapitchi)

OVA
RG Veda (Aizenmyo)
Mega Man: Upon a Star (Roll)

Video games
Crash Bandicoot series (Polar, Nina Cortex (Twinsanity))
Dragon Ball Xenoverse 2 (Zeno)
Guilty Gear series (May)
Klonoa 2: Lunatea's Veil (Tat)
Klonoa Beach Volleyball (Tat)
Klonoa Phantasy Reverie Series (Tat)
Konjiki no Gash Bell series (Umagon)
Legaia 2: Duel Saga (Marianne)
The Legendary Starfy (Starfy, Mermaid)
Magic Knight Rayearth (Sera)
Monster Hunter Tri (Cha-cha)
Phantom of Inferno (Cal Devens/ Drei)
Puyo Puyo~n (Harpy)
Ratchet & Clank: Size Matters (Luna)
Silhouette Mirage (Dynamis06)
Super Smash Bros. Melee (Pichu, Togepi)
Super Smash Bros. Brawl (Togepi)
Super Smash Bros. for Nintendo 3DS and Wii U (Togepi)
Super Smash Bros. Ultimate (Pichu, Togepi)
Tales of Phantasia (Super Famicom version) (Mint Adnade)
The King of Fighters All Star (May)
Clannad (Okazaki Ushio)
G-Senjou no Maou (Azai Kanon)
Tokimeki Memorial Girl's Side: 2nd Kiss (Young Saeki)
Magical Drop F - Lovers, World

Drama CDs
Gohan wo Tabeyou series 1 - 6 (Haruka Kuga)

Dubbing roles

Live-action
Clear and Present Danger (Sally Ryan (Thora Birch))
Ed (Liz (Doren Fein))
The Hard Way (Bonnie (Christina Ricci))
In America (Ariel Sullivan  (Emma Bolger))
Man on Fire (Lupita Martin Ramos (Dakota Fanning))
Multiplicity (Jennifer Kinney)
Patriot Games (Sally Ryan (Thora Birch))
This Boy's Life (Pearl Hansen (Eliza Dushku))
Village of the Damned (1998 TV Asahi edition) (Mara Chaffee (Lindsey Haun))
West Side Story (1990 TBS edition) (Graziella (Gina Trikonis))

Animation
We're Back! A Dinosaur's Story (Buster the Bird)
Kung Fu Panda (additional voices)
The Land Before Time franchise (Ducky)
ThunderCats (Snarf)
The Magic School Bus (Arnold Perlstein)
Bear in the Big Blue House (Ojo)
Rolie Polie Olie (Zowie)
Space Jam: A New Legacy (Tweety Bird)

Others
Nintendo's The Legendary Starfy television advertisement series (Starfy)

References

External links
 

1962 births
Living people
Japanese video game actresses
Japanese voice actresses
People from Machida, Tokyo
Production Baobab voice actors
Voice actresses from Tokyo
20th-century Japanese actresses
20th-century Japanese women singers
20th-century Japanese singers
21st-century Japanese actresses
21st-century Japanese women singers
21st-century Japanese singers
Japanese sopranos